The process of circuit design can cover systems ranging from complex electronic systems down to the individual transistors within an integrated circuit.  One person can often do the design process without needing a planned or structured design process for simple circuits. Still, teams of designers following a systematic approach with intelligently guided computer simulation are becoming increasingly common for more complex designs.  In integrated circuit design automation, the term "circuit design" often refers to the step of the design cycle which outputs the schematics of the integrated circuit. Typically this is the step between logic design and physical design.

Process

Traditional circuit design usually involves several stages. Sometimes, a design specification is written after liaising with the customer.  A technical proposal may be written to meet the requirements of the customer specification.  The next stage involves synthesising on paper a schematic circuit diagram, an abstract electrical or electronic circuit that will meet the specifications.  A calculation of the component values to meet the operating specifications under specified conditions should be made. Simulations may be performed to verify the correctness of the design.

A breadboard or other prototype version of the design for testing against specification may be built. It may involve making any alterations to the circuit to achieve compliance.  A choice as to a method of construction and all the parts and materials to be used must be made. There is a presentation of component and layout information to draughtspersons and layout and mechanical engineers for prototype production. This is followed by the testing or type-testing several prototypes to ensure compliance with customer requirements. Usually, there is a signing and approval of the final manufacturing drawings, and there may be post-design services (obsolescence of components, etc.).

Specification 

The process of circuit design begins with the specification, which states the functionality that the finished design must provide but does not indicate how it is to be achieved .  The initial specification is a technically detailed description of what the customer wants the finished circuit to achieve and can include a variety of electrical requirements, such as what signals the circuit will receive, what signals it must output, what power supplies are available and how much power it is permitted to consume.  The specification can (and normally does) also set some of the physical parameters that the design must meet, such as size, weight, moisture resistance, temperature range, thermal output, vibration tolerance, and acceleration tolerance.

As the design process progresses, the designer(s) will frequently return to the specification and alter it to take account of the progress of the design. This can involve tightening specifications that the customer has supplied and adding tests that the circuit must pass to be accepted.  These additional specifications will often be used in the verification of a design.  Changes that conflict with or modify the customer's original specifications will almost always have to be approved by the customer before they can be acted upon.

Correctly identifying the customer needs can avoid a condition known as 'design creep', which occurs in the absence of realistic initial expectations, and later by failing to communicate fully with the client during the design process. It can be defined in terms of its results; "at one extreme is a circuit with more functionality than necessary, and at the other is a circuit having an incorrect functionality". Nevertheless, some changes can be expected. It is good practice to keep options open for as long as possible because it's easier to remove spare elements from the circuit later on than it is to put them in.

Design 

The design process involves moving from the specification at the start to a plan that contains all the information needed to be physically constructed at the end; this happens typically by passing through several stages, although in the straightforward circuit, it may be done in a single step.  The process usually begins with the conversion of the specification into a block diagram of the various functions that the circuit must perform, at this stage the contents of each block are not considered, only what each block must do, this is sometimes referred to as a "black box" design.  This approach allows the possibly highly complex task to be broken into smaller tasks either by tackled in sequence or divided amongst members of a design team.

Each block is then considered in more detail, still at an abstract stage, but with a lot more focus on the details of the electrical functions to be provided. At this or later stages, it is common to require a large amount of research or mathematical modeling into what is and is not feasible to achieve.  The results of this research may be fed back into earlier stages of the design process, for example if it turns out one of the blocks cannot be designed within the parameters set for it, it may be necessary to alter other blocks instead.  At this point, it is also common to start considering both how to demonstrate that the design does meet the specifications, and how it is to be tested ( which can include self diagnostic tools ).

Finally, the individual circuit components are chosen to carry out each function in the overall design; at this stage, the physical layout and electrical connections of each component are also decided, this layout commonly taking the form of artwork for the production of a printed circuit board or Integrated circuit.  This stage is typically highly time-consuming because of the vast array of choices available.  A practical constraint on the design at this stage is standardization;. At the same time, a certain value of a component may be calculated for use in some location in a circuit; if that value cannot be purchased from a supplier, then the problem has still not been solved. To avoid this, a certain amount of 'catalog engineering' can be applied to solve the more mundane tasks within an overall design.

One area of rapid technology development is in the field of nanoelectronic circuit design.

Costs 

Generally, the cost of designing circuits is directly tied to the final circuits' complexity. The greater the complexity (quantity of components and design novelty), the more hours of a skilled engineer's time will be necessary to create a functional product. The process can be tedious, as minute details or features could take any amount of time, materials and manpower to create. Like taking into account the effects of modifying transistor sizes or codecs. In the world of flexible electronics, replacing the, widely used, polyimide substrates with materials like PEN or PET to produce flexible electronics, could reduce costs by factors of 5-10.

Costs for designing a circuit are almost always far higher than production costs per unit, as the cost of production and function of the circuit depends greatly on the design of the circuit.

Although the typical PCB production methods involve subtractive manufacturing, there are methods that use an additive manufacturing process, such as using a 3D printer to "print" a PCB. This method is thought to cost less than additive manufacturing and eliminates the need for waste management altogether.

Verification and testing 
Once a circuit has been designed, it must be both verified and tested. Verification is the process of going through each stage of a design and ensuring that it will do what the specification requires it to do. This is frequently a highly mathematical process and can involve large-scale computer simulations of the design.  In any complicated design, it is very likely that problems will be found at this stage and may affect a large amount of the design work to be redone to fix them.

Testing is the real-world counterpart to verification; testing involves physically building at least a prototype of the design and then (in combination with the test procedures in the specification or added to it) checking the circuit does what it was designed to.

Design Software 
In the Software of the visual DSD, the Logic Circuit of complement circuit is implemented by the compiling program code. These types of software programs are creating cheaper more efficient circuits for all types of circuits. We have implemented functional simulations to verify logic functions corresponding to logic expressions in our proposed circuits. The proposed architectures are modeled in VHDL language. Using this language will create more efficient circuits that will not only be cheaper but last longer. These are only two of many design software that help individuals plan there circuits for production.

Prototyping 
Prototyping is a big part of doing things that are very difficult. Circuit design forces you to keep going over things and fixing your mistakes. Circuit design is a very rigorous job to do and get done without making a mistake. Circuit designers must test many times to make sure their design works efficiently and, most of all, is safe for a consumer to buy and use. Prototyping is a big part of any electrical work because it is very meticulous and to the point. Everyone could probably imagine the mistakes made if there is no prototyping going on in work being done. These workers are getting paid to make electrical circuits and keep everyone who is buying these electrical circuits safe at home. The dangers of not prototyping and sending out a failed electrical circuit will include fires and hot wires, which will make someone not know and cause them to either be burned or severely hurt at the absolute worst.

Results 
Every electrical circuit starts with a circuit board simulator of how the things will be put together at the end of the day and show how the circuit will work virtually. A blueprint is the drawing of the technical design and final product. After all, this is done, and you use the blueprint to put the circuit together, you will get the results of electrical circuits that are quite memorable. The circuit will run anything from a vacuum to a big TV in a movie theater. All of these take a long time and a certain skill not everyone can acquire. The electrical circuit is something most things we need in our everyday lives.

Documentation 
Any commercial design will normally also include an element of documentation; the precise nature of this documentation will vary according to the size and complexity of the circuit and the country in which it is to be used.  As a bare minimum, the documentation will normally include at least the specification and testing procedures for the design and a statement of compliance with current regulations.  In the EU this last item will normally take the form of a CE Declaration listing the European directives complied with and naming an individual responsible for compliance.

Software

 Altium Designer
 EasyEDA
 gEDA
 KiCad
 OrCAD
 NI Multisim
 SPICE

See also

 Advanced Design System
 Circuit design language
 Configuration design
 Electrical system design
 Electronic circuit design
 Electronic design automation
 Espresso heuristic logic minimizer
 GDSII
 Integrated circuit design
 List of EDA companies
 Mesh analysis
 Open Artwork System Interchange Standard

References

Sources
 
 Diagram of possible design process
 US guide on CE marking
 UK guide on CE marking
 A beginners tutorial on understanding, analysing, and designing basic electronic circuits
 Vladimir Gurevich Electronic Devices on Discrete Components for Industrial and Power Engineering, CRC Press, London - New York, 2008, 418 p., ISBN 9781420069822

Electronic design
Electronic engineering